Natalie E. Hudson (born January 13, 1957) is a justice of the Minnesota Supreme Court.

Early life and education
Hudson is the daughter of Florence and Don Hudson. She graduated from Arizona State University in 1979. She then attended the University of Minnesota Law School, where she was the editor-in-chief of the school newspaper, Quaere. From 1980 to 1981 she was on the staff of the Law Review. She earned her Juris Doctor in 1982.

Career
She practiced housing law and worked as a staff attorney with Southern Minnesota Regional Legal Services from 1982 to 1986. She then took a position with the firm Robins, Zelle, Larson & Kaplan as an associate attorney in general civil litigation and employment law. From 1989 to 1992 Hudson was the assistant dean of student affairs at Hamline University School of Law. She then served as a city attorney for St. Paul from 1992 to 1994. Afterwards she served as Assistant Attorney General in the Office of the Minnesota Attorney General, working primarily in the criminal appeals and health licensing divisions.

Judicial service
Governor Jesse Ventura appointed Hudson to an at-large seat on the Minnesota Court of Appeals in 2002.

On August 18, 2015, Governor Mark Dayton nominated her to the Supreme Court to replace Alan Page effective September 1; Page had reached the court's mandatory retirement age of 70 earlier in August. She is the second African American woman named to the Court, after Wilhelmina Wright.

See also 
 List of African-American jurists

References

1957 births
Living people
African-American judges
Arizona State University alumni
Hamline University faculty
Minnesota state court judges
Justices of the Minnesota Supreme Court
University of Minnesota Law School alumni
Minnesota Court of Appeals judges
21st-century American judges
21st-century American women judges
American women academics
21st-century African-American women
21st-century African-American people
20th-century African-American people
20th-century African-American women